Much may refer to:

Much (TV channel), a cable network in Canada and its domestic and international spin-offs
Much TV, a satellite cable channel in Taiwan
Much (album), a 2001 album by Ten Shekel Shirt
Much the Miller's Son, one of Robin Hood's Merry Men from the earliest tales
 Much, North Rhine-Westphalia, a municipality in Germany
 Hans Much (1880–1932), a German author and physician
 Rudolf Much (1862–1936), an Austrian philologist and historian

See also

German-language surnames